Vītols (Old orthography: Wihtol(s); feminine: Vītola) is a Latvian topographic surname, derived from the Latvian word for "willow". Individuals with the surname include:

Aigars Vītols (born 1976), Latvian basketball player
Austris J. Vitols (born 1940), Latvian architect
Elīna Ieva Vītola (born 2000), Latvian luger
Jāzeps Vītols (1863–1948), Latvian composer
Rūdolfs Vītols (died 1942), Latvian middle-distance runner

See also
Vītoliņš

Latvian toponymic surnames
Latvian-language masculine surnames